A reuptake enhancer (RE), also sometimes referred to as a reuptake activator, is a type of reuptake modulator which enhances the plasmalemmal transporter-mediated reuptake of a neurotransmitter from the synapse into the pre-synaptic neuron, leading to a decrease in the extracellular concentrations of the neurotransmitter and therefore a decrease in neurotransmission.

The antidepressant tianeptine was once claimed to be a (selective) serotonin reuptake enhancer (SRE or SSRE), but the role of serotonin reuptake in its mechanism is doubtful. Tianeptine has no affinity for the serotonin transporter, neither increases nor decreases extracellular levels of serotonin in cortico-limbic structures of conscious rats, and it didn't show any other long-term effect on the serotonin pathway. Thus, tianeptine's role as an SSRE may have been the coincidence of a yet unknown mechanism of action. 

Coluracetam is a choline-reuptake enhancer. The flavone luteoline as well as some of its derivatives enhance the reuptake at the dopamine transporter, extracts of Caulis Sinomenii activate DA/NE transporters.

See also
 Reuptake inhibitor (RI)
 Releasing agent (RA)
 Serotonin modulator and stimulator (SMS), another term tentatively created to describe the action of a specific drug.

References

Drugs by mechanism of action
Psychopharmacology